"My Grandfather's Clock" is a song written in 1876 by Henry Clay Work, the author of "Marching Through Georgia". It is a standard of British brass bands and colliery bands, and is also popular in bluegrass music. The Oxford English Dictionary says the song was the origin of the term "grandfather clock" for a longcase clock. In 1905, the earliest known recording of this song was performed by Harry Macdonough and the Haydn Quartet (known then as the "Edison Quartet").

Storyline

The song, told from a grandchild's point of view, is about his grandfather's clock.

The clock is purchased on the morning of the grandfather's birth and works perfectly for 90 years, requiring only that it be wound at the end of each week.

The clock seems to know the good and bad events in the grandfather's life; it rings 24 chimes when the grandfather brings his bride into his house, and near his death it rings an alarm, which the family recognizes to mean that the grandfather is near death and gathers by his bed. After the grandfather dies, the clock suddenly stops, and never works again.

Sequel
Work published a sequel to the song two years after, and again the grandson acts as the narrator. The grandson laments the fate of the no-longer-functioning grandfather clock—it was sold to a junk dealer, who sold its parts for scrap and its case for kindling. In the grandfather's house, the clock was replaced by a wall clock, which the grandson disdains (referring to it as "that vain, stuck-up thing on the wall"). However, the sequel never reached the popularity of the original.

The song was covered and translated many times, versions in other languages may vary. For example, in the Czech version, sung by the country band Taxmeni, the song continues with an additional, joyful strophe, narrating further events in the grandson's life: the birth of his son and the purchase of a new clock on the same day, to maintain the family tradition.

Covers and inspirations

"My Grandfather's Clock" was often played in Britain on Children's Favourites and during that period was recorded by the Radio Revellers. In the United States, a version, without the last stanza of lyrics, was on an extended-play 45 rpm record on the Peter Pan label (the other song on that side was "The Syncopated Clock", and the flip side had "The Arkansas Traveler" and "Red River Valley"). Evelyn Knight recorded the song for Decca Records in 1945. Johnny Cash covered the song on his 1959 album Songs of Our Soil, as did Tennessee Ernie Ford on Gather 'Round the same year. Also in 1959, it was included on The Four Lads' album, Swing Along. Other versions became popular in other countries; it is well known to many generations in Japan, with a cover by singer Ken Hirai becoming massively popular in 2002.

In March 1961, on his album Swing Low, Sam Cooke did a rendition of the song.

Bing Crosby included the song in a medley on his album 101 Gang Songs (1961).

The song was the inspiration for the 1963 Twilight Zone episode "Ninety Years Without Slumbering".

The Big 3 recorded the song in their album Live at the Recording Studio in 1964

A popular clock toy, marketed by Fisher-Price from 1962 to 1968, had a dial on it that, when turned, caused the music box mechanism in the toy to play the song along with clock-like ticking and moving hands on the face of the clock. An updated version of the toy (which is completely made of plastic and with other activities like a clicking plastic mouse on the side) has been manufactured by Fisher-Price since 1994. Imitations of the toy made by various companies exist and are sold in various countries worldwide.

Jon Pertwee recorded a version in 1966 for the children's album Children's Favourites, on the Music for Pleasure record label.

John Fahey recorded a solo guitar version on his 1967 album Days Have Gone By.

Joan Morris recorded it in 1975, on Who Shall Rule This American Nation (Nonesuch), an album of songs by Work.

In 1983, Fred Penner, a Canadian children's entertainer, covered "My Grandfather's Clock" on the LP album Special Delivery, which was later rereleased as Ebenezer Sneezer on CD in 1994.

In 1986, Larry Groce sang the song on Disney Children's Favorite Songs 3.

A version of the song was recorded by Red Grammer on his 1994 family music recording, Down The Do Re Mi.

It was parodied as "My Grandfather's Grunge" by the Kenneth Williams character Rambling Syd Rumpo on the BBC radio show Round the Horne.

It was among the popular folk songs parodied by Allan Sherman in his medley song, "Shticks and Stones (Shticks of One, Half a Dozen of the Other)."

Garrison Keillor and the cast of the radio show A Prairie Home Companion recorded a parody titled "My Grandmother's Cat," telling the story of an old woman who overfed her cat until it was big enough to knock her down and try to eat her.

The melody was used in the track "I'm Not Edible" from the soundtrack of the 2000 game American McGee's Alice, composed by Nine Inch Nails drummer Chris Vrenna.

Ken Hirai released CD single "Ōki na Furudokei" (大きな古時計, A Big Old Clock) in 2002 and the song became one of the biggest hits in Japan that year.

The opening lines of the song are parodied in the song "Joy Division Oven Gloves" by English indie rock band Half Man Half Biscuit on their album Achtung Bono.

"My Grandfather's Clock" is a playable song in the 2008 video game Wii Music.

This song was also used in the game, Five Nights at Freddy's 2, made by Scott Cawthon, which was released on 10 November 2014. The chorus of the song plays whenever a music box is wound up to keep one animatronic character away; whereas, the other antagonists are unaffected by it.

The song serves as a leitmotif in the 2019 Korean television series Hotel del Luna.

It was also sung by Maple and Cinnamon in the third volume of Nekopara visual novel series.

The song is included in most Casio electronic keyboards.

Original Lyrics

My grandfather's clock was too large for the shelf,
So it stood ninety years on the floor;
It was taller by half than the old man himself,
Though it weighed not a pennyweight more.
It was bought on the morn of the day that he was born,
And was always his treasure and pride;
But it stopp'd short — never to go again —
When the old man died.

Ninety years without slumbering  (tick, tick, tick, tick),
His life seconds numbering, (tick, tick, tick, tick),
It stopp'd short — never to go again —
When the old man died.
In watching its pendulum swing to and fro,
Many hours had he spent while a boy.
And in childhood and manhood the clock seemed to know
And to share both his grief and his joy.
For it struck twenty-four when he entered at the door,
With a blooming and beautiful bride;
But it stopp'd short — never to go again —
When the old man died.

Ninety years without slumbering  (tick, tick, tick, tick),
His life seconds numbering, (tick, tick, tick, tick),
It stopp'd short — never to go again —
When the old man died.

My grandfather said that of those he could hire,
Not a servant so faithful he found;
For it wasted no time, and had but one desire —
At the close of each week to be wound.
And it kept in its place — not a frown upon its face,
And its hands never hung by its side.
But it stopp'd short — never to go again —
When the old man died.

Ninety years without slumbering  (tick, tick, tick, tick),
His life seconds numbering, (tick, tick, tick, tick),
It stopp'd short — never to go again —
When the old man died.
It rang an alarm in the dead of the night —
An alarm that for years had been dumb;
And we knew that his spirit was pluming for flight —
That his hour of departure had come.
Still the clock kept the time, with a soft and muffled chime,
As we silently stood by his side; 
But it stopp'd short — never to go again —
When the old man died.

Ninety years without slumbering  (tick, tick, tick, tick),
His life seconds numbering, (tick, tick, tick, tick),
It stopp'd short — never to go again —
When the old man died.

References

Zecher, Henry (October 2005). "How an old floor clock became a grandfather". The Pride of Olney (Lion's Club of Olney, Maryland) 30 (76). Retrieved 12 August 2013. on Henry Zecher's personal website

External links

 Score
 1905 recording from the Internet Archive
 Story of the clock
 {https://www.phrases.org.uk/meanings/grandfather-clock.html}
 {https://findhistoryhere.com/history-of-the-grandfather-clock}

1876 songs
Songs written by Henry Clay Work
Longcase clocks